Ray Goff (born July 10, 1955) is an American former college football player and coach. He served as the head coach at the University of Georgia from 1989 to 1995, compiling a record of 46–34–1.

Playing career
Goff attended the University of Georgia, where he played quarterback from 1974–1976, leading the team to 19 wins over his final two seasons under coach Vince Dooley. As a player, he was named Southeastern Conference player of the year in 1976 when the team he captained won the SEC title. He was a three-year letterman at Georgia.

Coaching career
Goff served as an assistant coach for the South Carolina Gamecocks before returning to Georgia as an assistant in 1981. While an assistant at Georgia from 1981 to 1988, he held the positions of recruiting coordinator, tight ends coach, and running backs coach, and earned a reputation as an excellent recruiter. When Dooley, the winningest coach in Georgia history, retired after the 1988 season, Goff — then a 33-year-old running backs coach — was the surprise choice to succeed him.

Head coaching career
Goff's tenure got off to a slow start, with just ten wins in his first two seasons, before reeling off nine wins in 1991 and ten in 1992; the latter campaign finished with Georgia ranked eighth by the Coaches Poll. Over the next three years, Goff's teams never again posted as many as seven wins, and he was fired in 1995. His teams only made brief appearances in the Coaches Poll in 1993, 1994 and 1995, reaching #13 in the 1993 preseason polls. Goff's 1995 team was on the receiving end of Steve Spurrier's "Half a Hundred Between the Hedges" game in which his Florida Gators team put up 52 points on the beleaguered Bulldogs. They were the first team to do so inside Sanford Stadium. Spurrier, known for his colorful comments about other coaches, subsequently referred to Goff as "Ray Goof." This would prove to be one of the final straws in Goff's tenure at Georgia. He was fired at the end of the year having acquired a 6–6 record.

Head coaching record

Quotes

References

1955 births
Living people
American football quarterbacks
Georgia Bulldogs football coaches
Georgia Bulldogs football players
South Carolina Gamecocks football coaches
People from Moultrie, Georgia
Players of American football from Georgia (U.S. state)